Michael Francis Rowland (September 12, 1963 – February 9, 2004) was an American jockey. He was born in Saratoga Springs, New York.

During his career, Rowland won 3,997 races.

Rowland died at University Hospital in Cincinnati, Ohio from head injuries suffered during a race on February 4 at Turfway Park, when his mount broke down and collapsed. Two other jockeys were injured. He was placed on life support, but never regained consciousness.

Turfway Park established the Michael F. Rowland Fund, as well as the Michael F. Rowland Award to honor the jockey who best exemplifies Rowland's work ethic, professionalism, and perseverance. The inaugural award recipient was Luis Antonio Gonzalez, a jockey based at Thistledown Racecourse near Cleveland. Thistledown racecourse also started a memorial fund for the Rowland family.

In 2006, Rowland was posthumously inducted into the Cleveland Sports Hall of Fame.

References

American jockeys
1963 births
2004 deaths
Jockeys who died while racing
Sports deaths in Kentucky
Sportspeople from Saratoga Springs, New York